Eric Ward (4 July 1913 – 12 August 2010) was an Australian rules footballer for the St Kilda Football Club. He was recruited from Malvern and Murrumbeena. His son, Geoff, also played in the VFL.

References

External links
 
 

1913 births
2010 deaths
St Kilda Football Club players
Australian rules footballers from Victoria (Australia)